Jeff Coetzee and Kristof Vliegen were the defending champions but decided not to participate.
Jerzy Janowicz and Jürgen Zopp won the title after defeating Nicholas Monroe and Simon Stadler 7–6(7–1), 6–3 in the final.

Seeds

Draw

Draw

External Links
 Main Draw

Tunis Open - Doubles
2012 Doubles